For the radio station in New Orleans, Louisiana that picked up the call letters in 2010, see WZRH.

WTKE-FM (100.3 MHz) is a radio station broadcasting a classic rock format. Licensed to Niceville, Florida, United States. The station serves the Fort Walton Beach area. WTKE-FM is owned by Omni Broadcasting, LLC.

The station was assigned call sign WNCV on May 7, 1992. On August 1, 2006, the station changed its call sign to WRKN. On November 19, 2009, WRKN swapped call signs with sister station WTKE-FM (which became WHWY). Prior to May 4, 2022, WTKE-FM was broadcasting sports as The Ticket Sports Network as a CBS Sports Network affiliate. The Ticket Sports Network is now on WTKE-FM HD 2 and broadcasts at 103.7 on translator W259AN and 97.1 on translator W246BN in Pensacola, Florida.

100.3 K-Rock is a classic rock formatted radio station with Alice Cooper and his Nights With Alice Cooper show. Additional programming on the station includes Carol Miller's Get The Led Out, Sammy Hagar's Top Rock Countdown, Live In Concert, and Dee Snider's House of Hair.

References

External links

TKE-FM
Classic rock radio stations in the United States
Radio stations established in 1992
1992 establishments in Florida